Sherif Farrag is an Egyptian-American fencer. He represented Egypt at the 2012 Summer Olympics in the team foil event. He represented the United States in World Cup competition before switching to Egypt.

Farrag graduated from Columbia University, where he competed on the Columbia Lions fencing team, in 2009.

References

Year of birth missing (living people)
Living people
Egyptian male foil fencers
Fencers at the 2012 Summer Olympics
Columbia Lions fencers